Ahtopol Peak is a sharp peak 510m in the Vidin Heights on Varna Peninsula, Livingston Island. The peak is named after the Black Sea town of Ahtopol, Bulgaria.

Location

The peak was first mapped in the Bulgarian Tangra 2004/05 topographic survey.

See also

 List of Bulgarian toponyms in Antarctica
 Antarctic Place-names Commission

Maps
 L.L. Ivanov et al. Antarctica: Livingston Island and Greenwich Island, South Shetland Islands. Scale 1:100000 topographic map. Sofia: Antarctic Place-names Commission of Bulgaria, 2005.
 L.L. Ivanov. Antarctica: Livingston Island and Greenwich, Robert, Snow and Smith Islands. Scale 1:120000 topographic map.  Troyan: Manfred Wörner Foundation, 2009.

References
 Ahtopol Peak. SCAR Composite Gazetteer of Antarctica
 Bulgarian Antarctic Gazetteer. Antarctic Place-names Commission. (details in Bulgarian, basic data in English)

External links
 Ahtopol Peak. Copernix satellite image

Mountains of Livingston Island